Alim Khan can refer to several people:
 Alim Khan (Kokand), the Khan of Kokand from 1801 to 1810
 Abdul Alim Khan, politician of Bharatiya Janata Party
 Said Mir Mohammed Alim Khan, the last emir of the Manghud dynasty